Linowo may refer to the following places:
Linowo, Kuyavian-Pomeranian Voivodeship (north-central Poland)
Linowo, Gołdap County in Warmian-Masurian Voivodeship (north Poland)
Linowo, Olsztyn County in Warmian-Masurian Voivodeship (north Poland)
Linowo, Szczytno County in Warmian-Masurian Voivodeship (north Poland)
Linowo, West Pomeranian Voivodeship (north-west Poland)